Defend the Defenseless is a memoir by Arese Carrington. Published in 2017.  It takes us into the lived experience of the Nigerian Civil War through the eyes of Arese Carrington as a young girl and then the struggle for democracy during the tyrannical military dictatorship as a young woman. 
A mantra her father gave her during the Nigerian civil war when their family was torn apart has continued to shape her life choices and belief in social justice. This memoir opens up to the impact of war and how situations we are thrust into shapes us one way or another.

Plot

Part one
Part One looks at the history of Nigeria and the factors that led to the Civil War. It narrates a childhood experience not in secessionist Biafra but being caught in the middle when the author's home city Benin was captured by Biafran soldiers. Defend the Defenseless provides both an invaluable historical background and a candid account of the author's personal experience of the Biafran war with her family. It tells of the pain of separation and loss, the joy of survival and reunion; and the consequences of the war that still linger on today.

Part two
Part Two covers a war of a different kind. It is about the battle for democracy under the third dispensation. A war of words, a battle of protest and resistance. The then U.S. Ambassador to Nigeria, Walter Carrington, who although a diplomat was a front row participant in the battle against the authoritarian military ruler to ensure Nigeria returned to democracy and that human rights were observed. A native Nigerian and a naturalized American, as the Ambassador's wife, the author found herself increasingly committed as they stood side by side with the Nigerian people. Behind the scene events that have never been revealed; letters and other documents; an epic love story destined to be; all link back to the Biafran war. Up front and personal are some of the accounts including being the first Nigerian selected to give the Harvard commencement Graduate oration.

Part three
Part Three highlights the countries and individuals who played a role. What was the attitude of some major countries towards Biafra during the war and their views on agitation for the restoration of Biafra now? It details Nigeria's turbulent journey since the war. It highlights the mantra the author's late father gave her which makes sure we look out for the vulnerable among us... We must defend the defenseless.

References 

Memoirs
2017 non-fiction books
Books about Nigeria